Barbara Sternberg (born in 1945) is a Canadian film director known for her experimental films. Sternberg directed films such as Opus 40 (1979), Transitions (1982), At Present (1990), Through and Through (1992), and Midst (1997).

Early life 
Sternberg was born in Toronto, Ontario on April 24, 1945. In her youth, she created art by writing books for her family members. Sternberg said that her use of photos and text in these books is "similar to the way I work now." She created her first film using her father's 16 mm camera in order to make a gift for her husband. Sternberg said, "My husband at the time didn't have any home movies and barely any photographs from his growing-up; so I wanted to make him this home movie, to create a past for him."

Although she did not initially consider her films as works of art, she eventually began to take them seriously. Sternberg attended Ryerson Polytechnic University to learn how to make films, but she ignored the teachings in order to make experimental films. "I didn't think at all about industrial film," she said. "I just started making stuff in a way I would later learn to call 'experimental.'"

Career 
Sternberg began her career in filmmaking during the mid-1970s and was one of the few female directors in Canada working in the avant-garde genre at the time. Sternberg has received significant national attention in Canada. The National Gallery of Canada, the Art Gallery of Ontario, Queen's University, and York University have all acquired her films for their collections.

Aside from her national recognition, Sternberg's films have also been featured in various international institutions, such as Museum of Modern Art in New York City and the Centre Georges Pompidou in Paris.

Directing techniques 
When she began her career, Sternberg transferred Super 8 images onto 16mm in order to modify the original image to give her films an imperfect finish. This distinguishing filming technique was used to give authenticity to her films. By making her films look like moving photographs, she was able to "turn reality into image".

Due to her interest in "images that bear the traces of life, body, and the materiality of film", Sternberg's films blurred the line between reality and fiction. Although Sternberg's films were initially characterized for her unique filming technique, she eventually began to utilize modern technology and incorporate them into her directing. By switching from "single channel video, to installation, to hand processed 16mm, to digital media and performance", Sternberg is thoroughly "engaged in finding the links between technological process and aesthetic production."

Contribution to the Canadian experimental film scene 
Through her contribution to the Canadian experimental film scene, Sternberg helped pave the way for other experimental female directors in Canada. As William Wees notes, "Women were, at best, marginally represented in the world of Canadian experimental film when Sternberg started making films. The recognition they received was instrumental in opening a predominantly male preserve to the work of female film and video-makers, many of whom have profited from her trail-blazing efforts without, I suspect, realizing who helped to open the way for them".

In addition, Sternberg also contributed to the Canadian experimental film scene by incorporating "a female aesthetic sensibility" into her films. As a result, Sternberg was able to bring a female perspective to Canadian experimental cinema that was not present before.

Filmography

Accolades

References

External links
Barbara Sternberg archives are held at the Clara Thomas Archives and Special Collections, York University Libraries, Toronto, Ontario
Official website of Barbara Sternberg

1945 births
Living people
Film directors from Toronto
Governor General's Award in Visual and Media Arts winners